José Gallegos y Arnosa (3 May 1857, Jerez de la Frontera - 20 September 1917, Anzio) was a Spanish painter and sculptor; best known for his church and clerical scenes.

Biography  
His father was employed by a winery. He was attracted to drawing and painting at an early age. He and his friend, Salvador Sánchez Barbudo, who shared his interests, frequently visited the studios of Luis Sevil (1817-1893), a local still-life painter. After learning as much as he could in Jerez, he left for Madrid in 1873 with the support of his father's employer, Guillermo Garvey (1834-?). There, he enrolled at the Real Academia de Bellas Artes de San Fernando. At his father's prompting, he initially studied architecture, but soon switched to painting and became a student of Federico de Madrazo.

Later, he developed an interest in Orientalist painting; travelling throughout North Africa. In 1878, his painting "Arab Wedding" was bought by the government. Urged on by Garvey, he used some of the money he received to continue his studies in Italy. By 1880, he had decided to settle in Rome. He continued to travel, however, visiting Munich, London, Paris and Berlin, as well taking an occasional trip home. His paintings sold well and he was able to enlist the Van Baerle brothers, of the Netherlands, as his agents. His works were also sold by Arthur Tooth & Sons in London.

In 1887, he married Giuseppina Trelanzi, of Milan. They had four children, including the architect, . She died in 1897. Three years later, he married  Constance Harding, the daughter of an English clergyman, whom he had met while she was vacationing in Italy with her mother. She was twenty-three years younger than him and they had five children.

He was awarded a gold medal at the International Exposition of Fine Arts (1891) in Berlin. His paintings may be seen at museums in Germany, Russia, and throughout North America. One was owned by William Randolph Hearst. Few of his paintings are in Italy, as he rarely exhibited there; possibly out of concern for creating jealousy among the other Spanish-born artists, of which there were many.

He spent every summer at a rented villa in Nettuno, near Anzio, where he painted en plein aire and hunted. One day, he was out hunting wild boar, when he fell from a tree and injured his spine. As he was recovering, he died from a stroke while watching a Corpus Christi procession. His death came less than twelve hours after the death of his eldest son, Lucas. They were buried together in Nettuno.
Constance and the children were left penniless and was forced to sell the paintings cheaply as he had not become popular yet. She ran a tea room near the British Embassy. Jose was great friends with the Italian royal family and the Queen used to take tea there, she was great friends with Constance. There was a German agent selling the paintings after José's death but paid in worthless German marks after the war. The children moved to the US, one marrying a steel magnate becoming the 4th richest woman in Canada.

Selected paintings

References

External links 

 Gallegos y Arnosa website Homepage
 More works by Gallegos @ ArtNet

1857 births
1917 deaths
Spanish painters
Spanish genre painters
Spanish orientalists
Real Academia de Bellas Artes de San Fernando alumni
People from Jerez de la Frontera
Spanish emigrants to Italy